Bongaigaon district (Prpn:ˈbɒŋgaɪˌgãʊ) is an administrative district in the state of Assam in northeastern India. The district headquarters are located at Bongaigaon. The district occupies an area of 1,093 km2.

Etymology 
According to lore, the name 'Bongaigaon' derives from the words 'bon' (wild) and 'gai' (cow). In the distant past, wild cows were often a menace to villagers in this area due to which the district got its name.

History
The district of Bongaigaon was created on 29 September 1989 from parts of Goalpara and Kokrajhar districts. 2004 saw a loss of size when part of the district was split to make Chirang district.

The district was part of Kamrup. In the 14th century, its rule was passed onto the Baro-Bhuyans. Later in the 1580s Nara Narayan of the Kamata kingdom conquered the area and it subsequently became the fiefdom of the Bijni family, who were descendants of Nara Narayan. When the Kamata kingdom split into Koch Bihar and Koch Hajo due to rivalry between the king and his nephew Raghu Rai, Bongaigaon became part of Koch Hajo. Soon Koch Hajo and Koch Bihar went to war, and the Mughal Nawab of Dhaka, supporting Koch Bihar, defeated Rai at Dhubri in 1602. Rai's son Parikshit signed a peace treaty, but hostilities resumed in 1614 and Parikshit was driven back to modern-day Guwahati, where he surrendered and soon after died. His son, Bijit Narayan, was made Zamindar of the region between the Manas and Sankosh: from him the Bijni family descended. Koch Hajo was tributary to the Mughals, but in the last decades of the 17th century Mughal influence waned significantly due to the Ahom-Mughal wars in which the Ahoms were eventually successful. Koch Hajo, including Bijni Zamindari, fell under Ahom influence.

In the late 1750s, the East India Company strengthened their influence in Bengal and Lower Assam. In 1822 the East India Company created Goalpara district containing present-day Lower Assam, the Garo Hills and northeastern Rangpur division in Bangladesh. The Bijnis continued to pay tribute to the British, and even gained a small amount of land after the Duar War in 1865. Rangpur and the Garo Hills were eventually stripped away to form different districts, but Goalpara continued to be administered as part of a Cooch Behar province. Eventually the Assam Valley province was founded in 1874, and Goalpara was moved to it. Goalpara was later divided into various districts including Kokrajhar and Dhubri, and later Bongaigaon.

Geography
Bongaigaon district is surrounded by Barpeta in the east, the Brahmaputra in the south and Kokrajhar in the north and west corner and share international border with Bhutan in the north.

The places that are worth visiting in Bongaigaon are eco-park, Bagheswari temple, tea garden, and Suryapahar. The history of Bagheswari temple is such that once a priest saw in his dream that Maa Bagheswari asked him to go to a particular place where if he digs out he will find a sword that belonged to Maa Bagheswari. And the next morning when the priest went to dig in the place he saw in his dreams, he found the sword. After that day a temple was built over the place and there they worship the sword. There is no idol inside the temple.

Economy
In 2006 the Indian government named Bongaigaon one of the country's 250 most backward districts (out of a total of 640). It is one of the eleven districts in Assam currently receiving funds from the Backward Regions Grant Fund Programme (BRGF).

Divisions
The district has three subdivisions: Bongaigaon, Bijni, and North Salmara. In 2004, parts of the Bongaigaon district (mainly areas under Bijni subdivision) were given over to form the Chirang district, under the Bodoland Territorial Council (BTC), with its district headquarters at Kajalgaon.

There are four Assam Legislative Assembly constituencies in this district: Bongaigaon, Bijni, Abhayapuri North, and Abhayapuri South. The latter is designated for scheduled castes. Bijni is in the Kokrajhar Lok Sabha constituency, whilst the other three are in the Barpeta Lok Sabha constituency.

Demographics 
According to the 2011 census, the total population of the district is 738,804, out of which 375,818 are males while 362,986 are females. The average sex ratio is 966. As per Census 2011 out of total population, 14.9% people lives in Urban areas while 85.1% lives in the Rural areas. The average literacy rate in urban areas is 87.4% while that in the rural areas is 66.4%. Also the Sex Ratio of Urban areas in Bongaigaon district is 960 while that of Rural areas is 967. The total literacy rate of Bongaigaon district is 69.74%. The male literacy rate is 63.09% and the female literacy rate is 54.26% in Bongaigaon district. Scheduled Castes and Scheduled Tribes made up 11.21% and 2.55% of the population respectively.

Religion

The district religious composition are as follows: Hindu 359,145, Muslim 371,033, Christian 5,924, Sikh 384, Buddhist 236, Jain 871 as per 2011 census report. Way back in 1971, Hindus were slight majority in Bongaigaon district with forming 69.8% of the population, while Muslims were 27.8% at that time.

Languages 

According to the 2011 census, 49% of the population spoke Assamese, 43.35% Bengali, 3.06% Hindi, 1.45% Rajbongshi and 1.13% Boro as their first language.

References

External links
 Bongaingaon district official website

 
Districts of Assam
Populated places established in 1989
Minority Concentrated Districts in India
1989 establishments in Assam

as:বঙাইগাঁও